Tom or Thomas Holliday may refer to:

 Tom Holliday (baseball) (born 1953), American college baseball coach
 Tom Holliday (rugby) (1898–1969), English rugby union and rugby league footballer
 Thomas C. Holliday (1890–1940), American football player and coach